The 74th Illinois General Assembly convened on January 6, 1965, and adjourned sine die on June 30, 1965.

Legislation 

The 74th General Assembly set a record for the number of bills introduced, at 3,590. Of these, 2,211 were passed by both houses and sent to the governor. Governor Otto Kerner Jr. vetoed 267 in their entirety and 13 in part. 

Notable laws enacted by the 74th General Assembly include the Local Governmental and Governmental Employees Tort Immunity Act, which provided sweeping protection from civil liability for government workers.  The legislature also enacted a measure to curb the use of billboards on Illinois highways, which was amended several times thereafter, and the state's first Good Samaritan law making physicians who render assistance in emergencies immune from civil liability.

Notable failed legislation in the 74th General Assembly included a measure to abolish capital punishment in Illinois, which passed the House by a 97–69 vote.  Had it been enacted, Illinois would have joined Iowa, New York, West Virginia, and Vermont in ending capital punishment that year.  Instead, the Illinois death penalty remained on the books until 2011.

Senate

Following the 1964 election, the Illinois Senate contained 58 members, one from each senate district.  Under the Illinois Constitution of 1870, Senators served overlapping 4-year terms. Thus, the 29 senators representing even-numbered districts were elected in 1964, the remainder having been elected in 1962.

Senate leadership

Party composition 

The Senate of the 74th General Assembly consisted of 33 Republicans and 25 Democrats.  The number of Democrats soon fell to 24, however, when Theodore Swinarski of the 14th District was unseated due to a failure to meet residency requirements.

State Senators

House of Representatives 

Under the Illinois Constitution of 1870, the state representatives were elected by cumulative voting, with each voter distributing three votes among the available candidates. The Illinois House of Representatives as elected in 1964 thus contained 177 members, representing three for each of the state's 59 House districts. 

However, in a nationally unprecedented event, in 1964 all members of the Illinois State House were elected at-large statewide, as a result of the legislature's failure to agree on a redistricting plan the previous year. Because of the length of the ballot, the election was remembered as the "bedsheet ballot" election.

Both parties ran slates of 118 candidates, having chosen two candidates from each of the 59 House districts in the primary election. The House had previously had a Republican majority, but in 1964 every Democratic candidate was elected, giving Democrats a two-thirds majority in the House. Representative Zeke Giorgi attributed the Democratic victory to the effect of the Democratic landslide in the presidential election.  As a result, the election saw a very large number of Republican incumbents lose their seats.  The election swept in 49 new Democratic representatives, launching the careers of several Democratic politicians who later became prominent, including Adlai E. Stevenson III and Harold Washington.

The members of the House represented a historically unusual proportion of Chicago-area representatives, because the at-large voting system eliminated the longstanding gerrymander in favor of downstate.  Consequently, Illinois' 1965 redistricting, which implemented the one person, one vote rule imposed by the United States Supreme Court in Reynolds v. Sims, had little effect on the subsequent balance of power in the House.

House leadership

Party composition

State Representatives

Works cited

References 

1965 in Illinois
Illinois legislative sessions
1966 in Illinois
1965 U.S. legislative sessions
1966 U.S. legislative sessions